Stenoptilia melanoloncha is a moth of the family Pterophoridae. It is known from Kenya.

References

Endemic moths of Kenya
melanoloncha
Moths of Africa
Moths described in 1927